Miniature Sensor Technology Integration-3 (MSTI-3) was a technology demonstration satellite operated by the United States Air Force. It was equipped with two infrared cameras and one visible light camera, designed to survey Earth's surface features and characterize their appearance in infrared wavelengths. MSTI-3 launched on 17 May 1996 aboard an Orbital Sciences Pegasus rocket.

Spacecraft 
Power was supplied by a single, three-faceted GaAs solar array mounted to one side of the spacecraft, providing an average of 291 watts at launch and 225 watts at end of life. A set of three reaction wheels provided attitude control, while hydrazine thrusters allowed for coarse maneuvering and momentum control. Global Positioning System equipment was added to provide enhanced orbital position information.

The spacecraft carried three instruments: a Short Wavelength Infrared Camera (SWIR), a Medium Wavelength Infrared Camera (MWIR), and a Visible Imaging Spectrometer (VIS), all sharing a single telescope. Data was stored on an 8.64 gigabit (1.08 gigabyte) experimental hard drive system, called Erasable Disk Mass Memory, before being downloaded through the Air Force Satellite Control Network.

Overview 
The Miniature Sensor Technology Integration program was started by the Ballistic Missile Defense Organization (BMDO) in December 1991, and was transferred to the United States Air Force by congressional direction in 1994. MSTI-3 was initiated by Phillips Laboratory at Kirtland Air Force Base. Its bus was designed and built by Phillips Laboratory, Spectrum Astro, and Wyle Laboratories, based on Spectrum Astro's SA-200S bus. The instrumentation was built by Science Applications International Corporation (SAIC). Mission management was provided by the Space and Missile Systems Center (SMC) at Los Angeles Air Force Base, while the spacecraft was controlled by SMC Detachment 2 out of Onizuka Air Force Station and later Kirtland AFB through the USAF Satellite Control Network. Operations and data processing was performed at the MSTI Payload Operations Center (MPOC), a component of the Naval Research Laboratory and managed by Analytical Services.

MSTI-3 was designed to take advantage of lessons learned from the previous two spacecraft in the MSTI program. Launched on 21 November 1992, MSTI-1 carried a single MWIR camera and met its primary objective of validating the SA-200S spacecraft bus during its six months in orbit. MSTI-2, launched on 9 May 1994, carried a PtSi SWIR camera and an InSb MWIR camera. It successfully observed a Minuteman-III missile as part of its primary objective of tracking boosting targets below the horizon, but failed in orbit after four months into its six-month mission.

MSTI-3's primary mission was to survey surface and atmospheric features of Earth in SWIR and MWIR to characterize how they vary in appearance across observational angles, times of day, and seasons. This data would be used to build statistical data to determine if it was feasible for space-based surveillance systems to track ballistic missiles in their coast phase against the warm background of Earth. The VIS instrument was used to verify the integrity of the infrared observations, and performed the secondary objective of conducting environmental monitoring at the same spatial resolution of the Landsat 5 and 6 spacecraft but with improved spectral resolution.

The launch of MSTI-3 occurred on 17 May 1996 at 02:44 UTC. The flight took place aboard a Pegasus Hybrid air-launched rocket carried by Orbital Science's Stargazer Lockheed L-1011 aircraft staged out of Vandenberg Air Force Base.

The spacecraft had a one-year primary mission, ending in June 1997, during which it collected more than 1.2 million images of  resolution or better. The U.S. Air Force determined that the collected data represented a "statistically relevant set" and declared mission success. However, the spacecraft remained healthy and additional funding, primary from the U.S. Army Space and Missile Defense Command and Phillips Laboratory, continued operations through November 1997. Eventually, concerns over an uncontrolled reentry dropping components on populated places, as well as funding issues and the potential of the spacecraft failing and becoming an orbital hazard (catalyzed by the failed MSTI-2 spacecraft passing within  of the Mir space station on 15 September 1997), motivated the SMD to direct MSTI-3 into a controlled reentry. ANSER, leading a team from several organizations, was directed on 10 November 1997 to create a plan for reentry; formal authorization to deorbit the spacecraft was given on 1 December 1997.

Power issues aboard MSTI-3, caused by lower-than-expected battery performance and complicated by the spacecraft entering a period of full eclipses during its orbit, forced mission controllers to begin deactivating on-board systems. This began with the infrared instruments on 29 October, GPS on 3 November, and the VIS instrument on 22 November. Even with these measures, an undervoltage event on 25 November caused the spacecraft to lose attitude control, delaying the start of deorbiting procedures. The first thruster burn took place on 2 December 1997 at 04:29:56 UTC while the spacecraft was over Hawaii, lasting 22 minutes 36 seconds and using  of propellant. Following the burn, additional power issues and oversaturated reaction wheels caused a loss of contact and vehicle control. Spacecraft command was reestablished by 3 December, though problems with star tracker point acquisition delayed establishment of attitude control until 11 December. Command sequences for the second and final burn had been pre-loaded onto the spacecraft, and were enacted that same day at 14:11:30 UTC. This burn was programmed to last 1 hour 40 minutes in order to burn the remaining  of propellant to depletion. It was predicted that the spacecraft would impact the Pacific Ocean approximately 45 minutes after the start of the burn, at around 14:56 UTC. While contact with the spacecraft was established by the Diego Garcia tracking station a few minutes after the burn started, no further contacts were made and radar observation confirmed that the spacecraft had deorbited.

MIRACL Experiment
In October of 1997, William Cohen, the Secretary of Defense, approved of a plan to use the MIRACL chemical laser to target the sensors on the MSTI-3 spacecraft. The experiment was carried out on October 17th. The results were not successful with the Army stating that the satellite malfunctioned and did not transmit all of the data needed to evaluate the test. While the Defense Department labeled the project as a research experiment there was much controversy about the apparent development of a weapon to blind or damage satellites.

References 

Earth observation satellites of the United States
Infrared technology
Military satellites
Military space program of the United States
Missile defense
Satellites of the United States Air Force
Spacecraft launched by Pegasus rockets
Spacecraft launched in 1996
Spacecraft which reentered in 1997